Héctor Luis Delgado Román is a former Puerto Rican rapper, singer and record producer, formerly known by the artistic names Héctor el Father and Héctor el Bambino. He rose to fame as a member of the duo Héctor & Tito (with Tito El Bambino) from 1996 to 2004, releasing four studio albums and a commercially successful live album.

As a solo artist, he was very successful in 2006 and 2007, selling more than 500,000 copies between his first studio album, The Bad Boy, and a compilation titled Los Rompe Discotekas, which was released under Roc-La-Familia. This American record label was founded in 2005 by rapper Jay-Z, focusing on Latin hip hop and reggaeton. As a producer, Delgado has worked with several reggaeton artists producers, as well as Emilio Estefan. He announced his retirement in 2008 in order to become a preacher but had a series of "Farewell Concerts" that went until May 2010. During his entire solo career, Héctor released four charting albums and seven charting singles, and has 400,000 certified units in the United States.

In 2008, Víctor Alexis Rivera Santiago, most known as Lele, claimed that Héctor owed him royalties for 40 songs written between 2003 and that year, and sued him. Both artists had issues between them, and Lele released a 12-minute-long diss track titled "O Me Pagas" with his duo companion Endo, claiming one million dollars for the songs he wrote for Delgado. They reconciled in 2010, and later that year Lele was shot to death 24 times in Trujillo Alto, Puerto Rico.

Despite being retired, Héctor participated in the 2010 compilation Golpe de Estado and in 2012 he collaborated with Wise, who wrote some of his songs and who is also a close friend. He currently works at a radio station rented by him and located in Juncos, Puerto Rico, where he conducts a Christian radio show named Un Nuevo Despertar (Spanish for A New Awakening) alongside Julio Voltio.

Albums

Studio albums

Compilation albums

Live albums

Singles

Music videos

Album appearances

See also 
 Héctor & Tito discography

References 

Héctor el Father
Discographies of Puerto Rican artists
Reggaeton discographies